The 2017 Junior World Weightlifting Championships were held in Ota City General Gymnasium, Tokyo, Japan from 15 to 23 June 2017.

Team ranking

Medal overview

Men

Women

Medal table
Ranking by Big (Total result) medals
 

Ranking by all medals: Big (Total result) and Small (Snatch and Clean & Jerk)

Points

References 

Start Book
Regulations
Results Book

IWF Junior World Weightlifting Championships
International sports competitions hosted by Japan
2017 in weightlifting
2017 in Japanese sport
Weightlifting in Japan
Sports competitions in Tokyo
2017 in Tokyo
June 2017 sports events in Japan